Ester Goossens (born 21 February 1972 in Amsterdam) is a retired Dutch athlete who competed in a variety of events, including the 400 metres, 800 metres and 400 metres hurdles. She represented her country at the 1997 World Championships and 1999 World Indoor Championships.

She holds national record in the 800 m indoor event.

Competition record

Personal bests
Outdoor
200 metres – 23.84 (Talence 1997)
400 metres – 51.35 (Malmö 1998)
800 metres – 1:59.24 (Hechtel 1998)
100 metres hurdles – 14.49 (+1.9 m/s) (Lisse 2002)
400 metres hurdles – 54.62 (Budapest 1998)

Indoor
200 metres – 24.29 (The Hague 1999)
400 metres – 51.82 (Valencia 1998)
800 metres – 2:00.01 (Stockholm 2001) 
60 metres hurdles – 8.94 (Frankfurt 1997)
High jump – 1.64 (Frankfurt 1997)
Long jump – 5.87 (Frankfurt 1997)
Shot put – 11.81 (Frankfurt 1997)
Pentathlon – 4212 (Frankfurt 1997)

References

1972 births
Living people
Dutch female hurdlers
Dutch female sprinters
Dutch female middle-distance runners
Dutch heptathletes
Athletes from Amsterdam
World Athletics Championships athletes for the Netherlands
20th-century Dutch women
21st-century Dutch women